Todd Park Mohr (born October 19, 1965) is the singer and guitarist for the American rock band Big Head Todd and the Monsters, as well as being their namesake and primary lyricist.  A founding member of the band, he also occasionally provides keyboards and saxophone.

Park Mohr was born in Colorado and is of Korean descent.  He attended Columbine High School, then Colorado State University in Fort Collins and later transferred to University of Colorado Boulder along with the other members of the band, which achieved some mainstream success in the early to mid-1990s.

Park Mohr formed Big Head Todd & the Monsters with friends from high school, while touring the night scene in Denver, Fort Collins, and Boulder.  Influenced by jazz music from an early age, he has incorporated several elements of it into his music, developing his own unique sound.  He primarily plays old Fender Stratocasters and Telecasters, although he has recently also been playing K-Line guitars. He is known for his raw, powerful solos and use of sweep picking.

References 

 http://www.bigheadtodd.com/timeline

Musicians from Denver
Living people
1965 births
Columbine High School alumni
American people of Korean descent
American people of German descent
Colorado State University alumni
University of Colorado Boulder alumni